Justice Merrill may refer to:

Charles Merton Merrill (1907–1996), associate justice and chief justice of the Nevada Supreme Court
Edward F. Merrill (1883–1962), associate justice of the Maine Supreme Judicial Court
Pelham J. Merrill (1907–1991), associate justice of the Alabama Supreme Court

See also
Justice Merrell (disambiguation)